Matthew Baines (19 September 1863 – 6 May 1925) was an English cricketer. He played eight first-class matches for Cambridge University Cricket Club between 1883 and 1890.

See also
 List of Cambridge University Cricket Club players

References

External links
 

1863 births
1925 deaths
English cricketers
Cambridge University cricketers
People from Molesey
Marylebone Cricket Club cricketers